The list of ship commissionings in 2003 includes a chronological list of all ships commissioned in 2003.


See also 

2003
 Ship commissionings